Eye of the Day is a Dutch/Indonesian documentary from 2001 directed by Leonard Retel Helmrich. The documentary released on 1 March 2001.

The documentary is the start of a trilogy and follows the family Sjamsuddin, existing of three generations in the slums of Jakarta Indonesia. The Dutch name is Stand van de Zon.

Writers
 Leonard Retel Helmrich
 Hetty Naaijkens-Retel Helmich

References

External links
 

Dutch documentary films
2001 films
2001 documentary films
Dutch-language films
Documentary films about families
Documentary films about Indonesia
Films directed by Leonard Retel Helmrich